Dadasara is a village in the Tral sub-district of Jammu and Kashmir.

The name of Dadasara is derived from the two words "Dadah", meaning deep, and "Sar" meaning lake. Dadasara is believed to have been once a deep lake. It is second largest village of Tral by area and population.

Villages in Pulwama district